{{DISPLAYTITLE:C21H25NO5}}
The molecular formula C21H25NO5 may refer to:

 Demecolcine, a drug used in chemotherapy
 Diacetyldihydromorphine, an opioid analgesic
 MIBE, a nonsteroidal antiestrogen
 MR-2096, an opioid analgesic